Parapoynx is a genus of moths of the family Crambidae described by Jacob Hübner in 1825.

Species
Parapoynx affinialis Guenée, 1854
Parapoynx allionealis (Walker, 1859)
Parapoynx andalusicum Speidel, 1982
Parapoynx andreusialis (Hampson, 1912)
Parapoynx azialis (Druce, 1896)
Parapoynx badiusalis (Walker, 1859)
Parapoynx bilinealis (Snellen, 1876)
Parapoynx bipunctalis (Hampson, 1906)
Parapoynx candida You & Li in You & Li, 2005
Parapoynx crisonalis (Walker, 1859)
Parapoynx curviferalis (Walker, 1866)
Parapoynx dentizonalis (Hampson, 1897)
Parapoynx diminutalis Snellen, 1880
Parapoynx discoloralis (Walker, 1866)
Parapoynx distinctalis Snellen, 1875
Parapoynx effrenatalis Berg, 1876
Parapoynx endoralis (Walker, 1859)
Parapoynx epimochla (Turner, 1908)
Parapoynx euryscia (Meyrick, 1885)
Parapoynx flavimarginalis Warren, 1889
Parapoynx fluctuosalis (Zeller, 1852)
Parapoynx fregonalis Snellen, 1880
Parapoynx fulguralis (Caradja & Meyrick, 1934)
Parapoynx fusalis (Hampson, 1896)
Parapoynx fuscicostalis (Hampson, 1896)
Parapoynx gualbertalis (Schaus, 1924)
Parapoynx guenealis Snellen, 1875
Parapoynx indomitalis Berg, 1876
Parapoynx ingridae Guillermet, 2004
Parapoynx insectalis (Pryer, 1877)
Parapoynx leucographa Speidel, 2003
Parapoynx leucostola (Hampson, 1896)
Parapoynx likiangalis (Caradja in Caradja & Meyrick, 1937)
Parapoynx longialata Yoshiyasu, 1983
Parapoynx maculalis Clemens, 1860
Parapoynx medusalis (Walker, 1859)
Parapoynx minoralis (Mabille, 1881)
Parapoynx moriutii Yoshiyasu, 2005
Parapoynx nivalis (Denis & Schiffermüller, 1775)
Parapoynx obscuralis (Grote, 1881)
Parapoynx ophiaula (Meyrick, 1936)
Parapoynx panpenealis (Dyar, 1924)
Parapoynx plumbefusalis (Hampson, 1917)
Parapoynx polydectalis (Walker, 1859)
Parapoynx pycnarmonides Speidel, 2003
Parapoynx qujingalis Chen, Song & Wu, 2006
Parapoynx rectilinealis Yoshiyasu, 1985
Parapoynx restingalis Da Silva & Nessimian, 1990
Parapoynx seminealis (Walker, 1859)
Parapoynx sinuosa (T. P. Lucas, 1892)
Parapoynx stagnalis (Zeller, 1852)
Parapoynx stratiotata (Linnaeus, 1758) – ringed china-mark
Parapoynx tenebralis (Lower, 1902)
Parapoynx tullialis (Walker, 1859)
Parapoynx ussuriensis (Rebel, 1910)
Parapoynx villidalis (Walker, 1859)
Parapoynx vittalis (Bremer, 1864)
Parapoynx votalis (Walker, 1859)
Parapoynx zambiensis Agassiz, 2012

Former species
Parapoynx circealis (Walker, 1859)
Parapoynx maroccana Speidel, 1982
Parapoynx tedyuscongalis Clemens, 1860

References

 
 , 2006: A review of the genus Parapoynx Hübner in China (Lepidoptera: Crambidae: Acentropinae). Aquatic Insects 28 (4): 291–303.
  2003: New species of Aquatic moths from the Philippines (Lepidoptera: Crambidae). Insecta Koreana 20 (1): 7-49.
 , 1999: Catalogue of the Oriental Acentropinae (Lepidoptera: Crambidae). Tijdschrift voor Entomologie 142 (1): 125–142.
  1985: A systematic study of the Nymphulinae and the Musotiminae of Japan (Lepidoptera: Pyralidae). Scientific Reports of the Kyoto Prefectural University Agriculture, Kyoto 37: 1–162.

External links

Acentropinae
Crambidae genera
Taxa named by Jacob Hübner